Carlijn Achtereekte (born 29 January 1990) is a Dutch former speed skater who specialises in long distances. Achtereekte won three silver medals in the 5000 metres at the Dutch Single Distance Championships. At the 2015 World Single Distance Speed Skating Championships in Heerenveen, she won the silver medal at the 5000 metres event behind Martina Sáblíková. Currently Achtereekte is a professional cyclist, competing for Team Jumbo–Visma.   

At the 2018 Winter Olympics, her first Olympic Games, Achtereekte took a surprise gold medal in the 3000 metres, leading home team-mates Ireen Wüst and Antoinette de Jong in a Dutch clean sweep of the podium, despite never having won a World Cup race. On 23 March 2018 she was awarded Knight of the Order of Orange-Nassau by King Willem-Alexander.

Personal records

Per January 2022 she is ranked 11th on the adelskalender with a points total of 157.360

Tournament overview

source:

Medals won

References

External links

1990 births
Dutch female speed skaters
Sportspeople from Deventer
Living people
Olympic speed skaters of the Netherlands
Speed skaters at the 2018 Winter Olympics
Speed skaters at the 2022 Winter Olympics
Olympic speed skaters of Norway
Olympic gold medalists for the Netherlands
Medalists at the 2018 Winter Olympics
Olympic medalists in speed skating
World Single Distances Speed Skating Championships medalists
Knights of the Order of Orange-Nassau
21st-century Dutch women